"One Way Trigger" is a song by American rock band the Strokes. Written primarily by Albert Hammond Jr. and Julian Casablancas, it was released as a free download ahead of their fifth studio album, Comedown Machine and was made available for streaming via YouTube and SoundCloud, and as a free download via the band's official website on January 25, 2013. Casablancas posted a stylized lyric sheet for the song, designed by long-time collaborator Warren Fu, on his official website on January 30, 2013. The song is one of the few from Comedown Machine to have been performed live, and is the only Strokes song to have ever been performed live by Hammond Jr. as a solo artist.

Composition
The song was the first written by Hammond Jr. following rehabilitation for his drug addiction. It is synth-driven, similarly to several tracks on the band's previous album, Angles, and features unusual falsetto vocals from singer Julian Casablancas, as well as the first instance of an acoustic guitar on a Strokes recording.

Track listing

Charts

References

The Strokes songs
Songs written by Julian Casablancas
2013 songs
Songs written by Albert Hammond Jr.